Pelitpınarı is a village in Silifke district of Mersin Province, Turkey. The population of the village was 247 as of 2011. The village was founded by a tribe from Karaman. Main economic activities are agriculture and goat breeding. Main crops are pistachio, figs, plum and hickory nut.

References

Villages in Silifke District